SkyView de Pier is a 45-meter tall Ferris wheel in Scheveningen, The Hague. It was the first Ferris wheel constructed over sea in Europe, as it is on the Scheveningen Pier eight meters above the North Sea. It opened to the public on August 19, 2016.

Design 

The Netherlands-based Dutch Wheels designed and constructed the wheel. It is a model R50SP-36. It has 36 climate controlled gondolas that can accommodate 6 people each. A dining car can be reserved for dinner or high tea. A VIP gondola features a glass floor.

References

External links 

  

Ferris wheels in the Netherlands